The Roman Catholic Archdiocese of Kota Kinabalu (Lat: Archdioecesis Kotakinabaluensis) is a metropolitan archdiocese of the Latin Church of the Roman Catholic Church in Sabah, a state of Malaysia on the island of Borneo. The archdiocese is the oldest ecclesiastical territory in Malaysia, with a long history slowly rising along with the Catholic population from a prefecture to an archdiocese. Its cathedral archepiscopal see is Sacred Heart Cathedral, Kota Kinabalu.

History 
Originally erected on 4 September 1855 as the Apostolic prefecture of Labuan and Borneo, created on territory split off from the then Apostolic Vicariate of Batavia (Java) (including the neighbouring Dutch East Indies).
 
On 5 February 1927 it was renamed the Apostolic Prefecture of Northern Borneo, and lost territory to form the Apostolic Prefecture of Sarawak.
 
On 14 February 1952 the prefecture was promoted to Apostolic Vicariate of Jesselton, hence entitled to a titular bishop. On 22 March 1962 its name was changed once more to the Apostolic Vicariate of Kota Kinabalu, after its see.
 
On 31 May 1976 the vicariate was elevated to a full Diocese of Kota Kinabalu, suffragan in the ecclesiastical province of the Metropolitan Archdiocese of Kuching.
 
The diocese lost territories twice, to create its present suffragans :
 on 17 December 1992 the diocese the Diocese of Keningau with the appointment of Cornelius Piong. 
 on 16 July 2007 the Diocese of Sandakan with the appointment of Julius Dusin Gitom.

On 23 May 2008, the diocese was elevated to Metropolitan Archdiocese, whose ecclesiastical province comprises the above suffragan dioceses, both formerly part of the original territory of the diocese of Kota Kinabalu: the Diocese of Keningau and the Diocese of Sandakan.

On 21 June 2010, Pope Benedict XVI appointed John Wong Soo Kau, director of the aspirants' formation house in Kota Kinabalu, as Coadjutor Archbishop of Kota Kinabalu. His ordination took place on 1 October 2010.

 the Archbishop of Kota Kinabalu is John Wong Soo Kau, appointed in 2010. His predecessor was John Lee Hiong Fun-Yit Yaw, appointed in 1987 and retired on 1 December 2012.

The patron saint of the archdiocese is Saint Joseph, Husband of Mary.

Prelates

Apostolic prefects of Labuan and Borneo 
 Don Carlos Cuarteroni (23 August 1855 – March 1879)

Apostolic prefects of Labuan and Northern Borneo 
 Thomas Jackson (18 July 1881 – 20 October 1895)
 Edmund Dunn (4 May 1897 – 5 February 1927)

Apostolic prefects of Northern Borneo 
 August Wachter, MHM Matyr. (26 July 1927 – 1945)
 James Buis, MHM, (18 January 1947 - 14 February 1952)

Apostolic vicars of Jesselton/Kota Kinabalu 
 James Buis (1 May 1952 – 1969)
 Peter Chung Hoan Ting (15 Nov 1970 – 30 January 1975)
 Simon Michael Fung Kui Heong (29 August 1975 – 31 May 1976)

Bishops of Kota Kinabalu 
 Simon Michael Fung Kui Heong (31 May 1976 – 16 November 1985)
 John Lee Hiong Fun-Yit Yaw (26 June 1987 – 23 May 2008)

Archbishops of Kota Kinabalu 
 John Lee Hiong Fun-Yit Yaw (23 May 2008 – 1 December 2012)
 John Wong Soo Kau (1 December 2012 – current)

Clergy

Archbishops 
 John Wong Soo Kau, Archbishop
 John Lee Yit Yaw, Archbishop Emeritus

College of Consultors 
 Nicholas Stephen Juki Tinsung (Vicar General)
 Wilfred Atin (Chancellor)
 Primus Jouil
 Cosmas Lee Khod Min

List of parishes 
As of 2023, there are 23 parishes including various sub-parishes and 229 Outstations found in the Catholic Archdiocese of Kota Kinabalu.
 Sacred Heart Cathedral Parish (Sacred Heart Cathedral, Karamunsing)
 sub-parish of Carmelite Monastery Chapel, Karamunsing
 Church of Mary Immaculate Parish, Bukit Padang
 St Pius X Church Parish, Bundu Tuhan, Ranau
 St Paul's Church Parish, Dontozidon, Penampang
 sub-parishes of Our Lady Queen of Peace Church, Kobusak, Penampang and
 St John's Chapel Kopungit, Kepayan, Kota Kinabalu
 St Catherine's Church Parish, Inanam, Kota Kinabalu
 sub-parish of Church of the Divine Mercy, KKIP, Sepanggar, Kota Kinabalu
 Church of the Good Shepherd Parish, Manggatal, Kota Kinabalu
 Holy Trinity Parish, Inobong-Madsiang, Penampang
 sub-parishes of Church of Saints Peter and Paul, Babagon, Penampang
 Church of the Sacred Heart of Jesus, Inobong, Penampang (centre)
 Church of St Joseph the Worker, Pogunon, Penampang
 Church of the Presentation, Pongobonon, Buayan, Penampang
 Church of Christ the King, Kipouvo, Penampang
 Church of St Thomas the Apostle, Togudon, Penampang
 Church of St Martin, Moyog, Penampang
 Church of the Holy Cross, Togudon, Penampang
 Church of St Andrew the Apostle, Longkogungan, Babagon, Penampang
 Church of the Risen Christ, Timpangoh, Babagon, Penampang
 Madsiang Catholic Church, Madsiang, Penampang
 St Joseph the Husband of Mary Church Parish, Tombongon, Kiulu, Tuaran
 sub-parishes of St Martin's Church, Malanggang,
 St Michael the Archangel Church, Lokub and
 St John Vianney Church, Pukak
 St Edmund's Church Parish, Kota Belud
 St Theresa's Church Parish, Kota Marudu
 St Peter's Church Parish, Kudat
 Church of the Blessed Sacrament Parish, Labuan
 St Simon Catholic Church Parish, Likas, Kota Kinabalu
 Holy Rosary Parish, Limbahau, Papar
 sub-parishes of St Patrick's Church, Kinuta, Papar
 and St Sabina's Church, Titimbuongon, Papar
 St Joseph's Church Parish, Papar 
 St Michael's Church Parish, Donggongon, Penampang 
 sub-parishes of St Aloysius, Limbanak, Penampang and
 Assumption of Our Lady, Sugud, Penampang
 St Anne, Punson, Kinarut, Papar
 St Martin, Mook, Kinarut, Papar
 St Padre Pio, Labak, Kinarut, Papar
 Divine Mercy, Maang, Penampang
 Mary Immaculate Conception, Sukang Mabpai, Inanam, Kota Kinabalu
 St Marcellinus, Minintod, Inanam, Kota Kinabalu
 St Paul's Chapel on The Hill, Montfort Kinarut, Papar
 St Theresa of The Child Jesus, Kolopis, Penampang
 Woori Jib, Potuki, Kinarut, Papar (formerly Hamin Tokou Potuki)
 St Benedict, Timpangoh Laut, Sugud, Penampang
 St Paul, Bisuang, Papar
 St Pope John Paul II, Buayan, Penampang (formerly St Patrick, Buayan)
 St Bernard, Terian, Penampang
 St Julius I, Timpayasa, Penampang
 Chapel of Mary Mother of Ecclesia, Tiku, Penampang
 St Augustine Church Parish, Kinarut, Papar
 St Peter Claver's Church Parish, Ranau
 Stella Maris Church Parish, Tanjung Aru, Kota Kinabalu
 sub-parish of St Catherine Laboure Church, Putatan, Penampang
 St Thomas Church Parish, Kepayan, Kota Kinabalu,
 Holy Family Church Parish, Telipok, Kota Kinabalu
 Holy Nativity Church Parish, Terawi, Penampang
 sub-parishes of Our Lady of Fatima Church, Talang Taun, Ulu Putatan, Penampang,
 St Simon the Zealot Church, Duvanson, Putatan, Penampang, and
 St Peter the Apostle Church, Tombovo, Putatan, Penampang
 St John's Church Parish, Tuaran
 sub-parishes of St Mary's Mother of God Church Topokon,
 St Philip the Apostle Church, Tamparuli,
 St Clare of Assisi Church, Koporingan and
 St James's the Apostle Church, Tenghilan

Religious orders

Religious men 
 Brothers of the Christian School (FSC); De La Salle Brothers
 Brothers of St Gabriel (SG); Gabrielite or Monfort Brothers 
 Clerical Society of the Most Holy Trinity (SST)
 Marist Brothers of the Schools (FMS)

Religious women 
 Discalced Carmelite Nuns (OCD)
 Daughters of St Paul (FSP)
 Good Shepherd Sisters (RGS)
 Franciscan Sisters of the Immaculate Conception (FSIC)

Media apostolate/social communications

Publications 

 Catholic Sabah (fortnightly newspaper) Established in 1957. 
 Lu (Chinese bimonthly)

Bookshops 
 Catholic Books Distribution Centre 
 Paulines Media Centre (In Charge: Magdalene Chong)

See also 
 Catholic Church in Malaysia
 List of Roman Catholic dioceses in Malaysia

Sources and external links
 GigaCatholic, with incumbent biography links
 Catholic-Hierarchy

Roman Catholic dioceses in Malaysia
Religious organizations established in 1855
Roman Catholic dioceses and prelatures established in the 19th century